Ibsen Martínez (born 20 October 1951) is a columnist, mathematician, journalist, and playwright from Caracas, Venezuela. Ibsen is a graduate from Central University of Venezuela in pure mathematics.

Since 1995, he has written a weekly column for El Nacional. His writings have appeared in El Nuevo Herald, The New York Times, Letras Libres, and El País. Martinez has also written several plays for the theater.

Martínez also writes soap operas (called "telenovelas" in Latin America). One of them was "Por Estas Calles" (Along these streets) a television drama, in 1992.

References

External links 
 The Washington Post, PostGlobal Panelist

1951 births
Living people
People from Caracas
Venezuelan journalists